Ira Matthew Vandever (born November 22, 1980) is the starting quarterback for the Stuttgart Scorpions in the German Football League.  He attended McCluer North High School in Florissant, Missouri where he was a two-year starter, and also Drake University in Des Moines, Iowa where he was a four-year starter.  During his time at Drake, Vandever set 15 individual records as well as helped Drake win the Pioneer Football League in 2000.

Drake University
As a freshman, Vandever split quarterback duties with Solon Bell.  As a sophomore, he led the Bulldogs to a Pioneer Football League championship in his first year as a full-time starter.  By the end of his tenure at Drake, Vandever set records in career passing yards (7,868), most net passing yards in a season (3,239), most passes completed in a season (205), most passes attempted in a season (361) and in a game (51), highest completion percentage in a career (.548), most touchdown passes in a career (67), most touchdown passes in a season (32), most touchdown passes in a game (6), most career interceptions (35), most yards total offense in a career (9,161), a season (3,654), and a game (464), and most total offensive plays in a career (1,353) and a season (488), and a game (66).

References

1980 births
Living people
People from McKinley County, New Mexico
People from St. Louis County, Missouri
Players of American football from Missouri
American football quarterbacks
Drake Bulldogs football players
German Football League players